Laurent Barbé was a French shipbuilder born about 1696. He came to the attention of Frederik Danneskiold-Samsøe, when in 1739 the newly formed Danish Naval Construction Commission was seeking a replacement chief designer and shipbuilder. Barbé enjoyed Danneskiold's patronage and protection for some six years but fell out of favour when Danneskiold retired from the Construction Commission.

Personal life
Nothing is known of Laurent Barbé's personal or professional life before Copenhagen. He married Brigitte Agnes Mariane Schenck, some thirty years his junior, the daughter of a senior officer in royal lifeguard regiment.

Shipbuilder to the Royal Danish Navy
The design of Barbé's first ship of the line for Denmark (which would become Elephanten 1741) was produced by Barbé as part of a competition between him and another French shipbuilder, du Chemin, for the position of the new master shipbuilder to the Danish fleet. Barbé's  employment dated from 6 May 1740, by which time construction of the new ship had already started.  Despite concerns over the quality of its keel, Elephanten proved to be an excellent ship and the technical drawings set the standard for future work.

He was reticent about revealing his construction methods to the Danish Naval Construction Commission which caused some problems but as a protege of Danneskiold-Samsøe he survived in his position. Barbé also designed a frigate, a slightly smaller ship of the line (of 70 guns) and a royal yacht. Elephanten was judged to be an excellent ship when it entered service, and the technical drawings became a standard for future similar ships. He also had failures and his small frigate (which may have been a brigantine -see below) HDMS Æroe was a very mediocre sailer.
In 1743, he obtained various French ship designs, which were built at Copenhagen and in 1744 was commissioned to design and build a galley - which proved a good sailing vessel but responded poorly when rowing.

Sacked
With the departure of Danneskiold, Count of Samsøe in November 1746, Barbé lost all support in the shipyard, had disagreements with the Construction Commission and was retired on a pension of 500 rdl in 1747.
His collection of design drawings was seized on his dismissal and put into the Danish admiralty's collection for future use.
Barbé continued to live in Copenhagen until his death, in straitened circumstances, on 21 March 1764.

HDMS Elephanten (1773) is credited to the design of Barbé, although she was launched 26 years after Barbé's departure. (The plans available on line, for ornamentation drawn in 1772 and receiving royal approval, are signed Håndværksmester/Bygmester: Møllerup).

Barbé's ships
The Royal Danish Navy's database attributes the following ships designs to Barbé. Note that many of them were built after Barbé left his position in the Danish shipyards, indeed one after his death:
Christiansøe 1741 frigate
Cronprindsen 1756 ship of the line
Dannemark 1757 ship of the line
Docqven 1747 frigate
Dronning Juliana Maria 1752 ship of the line
Elephanten 1741 ship of the line
Elephanten  1773 ship of the line
Jaegersborg 1745 boat/galley
Nellebladet 1746 ship of the line
Neptunus 1750 ship of the line
Samsøe (22) 1746 frigate
Sælland (Sjælland) 1750 ship of the line
Tre Croner (Tre Kroner) 1742 ship of the line

Recorded elsewhere
Ærøe 1744 brigantine of 10 guns and a crew of 53

Notes

References
Footnotes

Sources
Balsved J.- Danish Naval History website - before 1801
Bjerg H C: Laurent Barbe in Dansk Biografisk Leksikon, 3rd Ed., Gyldendal 1979–84. Accessed 18.May 2019
Nielsen,E Dansk Militærhistorie Website "Major Danish Warships Built at the Holmen Shipyard 1692–1744" (in English)
Skibregister at Royal Danish Naval Museum

18th-century Danish shipbuilders
French emigrants to Denmark